This is a list of Central Arkansas Bears football players in the NFL Draft.

Key

Selections

References

Central Arkansas

Central Arkansas Bears NFL Draft